Jelena Petrova (born June 6, 1989) is an Estonian former swimmer, who specialized in long-distance freestyle events. She is a 19-time Estonian long-course swimming champion, 11-time short-course swimming champion and a three-time Nordic junior champion.

Petrova qualified for the women's 800 m freestyle, as Estonia's youngest swimmer (aged 15), at the 2004 Summer Olympics in Athens, by clearing a FINA B-standard entry time of 9:00.40 from the European Junior Championships in Lisbon, Portugal. She challenged six other swimmers on the first heat, including El Salvador's Golda Marcus (a varsity swimmer for the Florida State Seminoles). Petrova cruised to third place by two tenths of a second (0.20) behind fellow 15-year-old Kwon You-Ri of South Korea in 9:01.62. Petrova failed to advance into the final, as she placed twenty-third overall in the preliminaries.

She holds Estonian record in 800m freestyle swimming (Short Course).

References

External links
Profile – ESBL 

1989 births
Living people
Olympic swimmers of Estonia
Swimmers at the 2004 Summer Olympics
Estonian female freestyle swimmers
Swimmers from Tallinn
Estonian people of Russian descent
21st-century Estonian women